Gökhan Alkan (born 8 December 1987) is a Turkish actor. He is multi-faceted in various fields and is trained in solfège, singing and is professionally engaged in acting, sports, voice acting, poetry and lyricism.

Early life 
Gökhan Alkan was born on December 8, 1987 in Istanbul, Turkey as the only child of an immigrant family. He has an Associate Degree from Kocaeli University in "Teaching Automotive Technologies" and another Associate Degree from Anadolu University in "Foreign Trade and Marketing". He was involved in amateur theatre groups in high school and university years and gave live music performances during the same time. After studying for a year at Müjdat Gezen Art Center, he was chosen for the Müjdat Gezen Theatre as a professional actor.

Alkan received his acting and singing education at MSM Actor Studio and Müjdat Gezen Art Center. From 2010 to 2013, he acted in several plays for two seasons at Müjdat Gezen Theatre and after graduation he eventually set up his own theatre with a group of friends.

Career
The first television experience of Alkan in professional terms has been with the historical series Muhteşem Yüzyıl, a project that was launched in 2011 and brought a big sound. He joined several episodes of Muhteşem Yüzyıl as a guest actor, drawing a lot of attention towards his performance and personality. As a result, he was cast for several lead roles afterward. Alkan started being recognized as a mainstream actor in Turkey with his lead role as Tarık Uygun in Kocamın Ailesi, which had a run of two seasons with 57 episodes with Beren Gökyıldız. 

Following Kocamın Ailesi Alkan was cast for the lead roles in series Seviyor Sevmiyor with Zeynep Çamcı and medical series Kalp Atışı with Öykü Karayel as Yiğit Balcı and Ali Asaf Denizoğlu. He shared the lead roles with Yağmur Tanrısevsin in the romantic drama Kalp Yarası.

In 2016, Alkan played lead roles in two non-commercial films, Makas and Defne'nin Bir Mevsimi. Defne'nin Bir Mevsimi was crowned with many titles in numerous film festivals and was awarded the Best Film at the 9th Montreal Turkish Film Festival in 2017. Alkan was honored with a Special Award at 5th APAN Star Awards held in South Korea for his performance as Yiğit Balcı in Seviyor Sevmiyor, a variation of a Korean production. He was a part of the ensemble cast of Organik Aşk Hikayeleri, a feature film consisting of 8 short films. Organik Aşk Hikayeleri was nominated for 7 awards at the 2017 Madrid International Film Festival with one win, and 4 awards at the 2017 Toronto ReelHeART International Film Festival with wins Best Foreign Language Film and Best Ensemble Cast.

Personal life 
Alkan is diagnosed with Asperger’s syndrome and has used this condition as an advantage to concentrate and give all his energies to his work. Due to this condition Alkan has been forced to plan and schedule his life since he was diagnosed.

Filmography

Films

Television series

Theatre

Awards and nominations

References

External links 
 

1987 births
Living people
Male actors from Istanbul
Turkish male television actors
Turkish male film actors